USS West Virginia (SSBN-736) is a United States Navy  ballistic missile submarine. She has been in commission since 1990. She is the third U.S. Navy ship to be named for West Virginia, the 35th state, and the 11th of 18 Ohio-class submarines.

Construction and commissioning
The contract to build West Virginia was awarded to the Electric Boat Division of General Dynamics Corporation in Groton, Connecticut, on 21 November 1983 and her keel was laid down there on 24 December 1987.  She was launched at Electric Boat in Groton Connecticut on 14 October 1989, sponsored by Mrs. Erma Byrd, wife of United States Senator Robert C. Byrd of West Virginia, and commissioned on 20 October 1990, in the dry-dock of the Kings Bay Georgia Submarine Base, with Captain J. R. Harvey in command of the Blue Crew and Captain Donald McDermott in command of the Gold Crew.

Service history
West Virginia is based at Naval Submarine Base Kings Bay, Georgia.

On 29 December 2008, Captain Daniel Mack, commander of Submarine Squadron 16/20, relieved West Virginias commanding officer, Commander Charles "Tony" Hill, of command "due to a loss of confidence" in Hills ability to command.  Captain Stephen Gillespie was assigned as West Virginias temporary commanding officer.

In September 2010 the approximate 300 Sailors assigned to the two crews that alternate patrols on West Virginia merged into one crew of about 110 sailors during the overhaul and refueling, which was done at the Norfolk Navy Shipyard (NNSY) in Portsmouth, Virginia, beginning in early 2011. Commander Adam D. Palmer relieved Commander Steven K. Hall as commanding officer of West Virginia during a change of command ceremony 9 September at Naval Medical Center in Portsmouth, Virginia. Commander Joseph W. Coleman relieved Commander Palmer during a change of command ceremony 25 November 2014 at St. Mary's Waterfront in St. Mary's, Georgia.

On 24 October 2013, West Virginia departed Norfolk Naval Shipyard after a thirty-month refuel and overhaul. On 3 November 2013 she returned to her homeport of Kings Bay, Georgia.

Community Support
West Virginias Blue and Gold crew members regularly return to the state of West Virginia to participate in parades, community service projects and initiatives. West Virginia's commissioning crew established a relationship with the West Virginia Children's Home (WVCH) in 1990. WVCH Director Carson Markley, who attended the ship's commissioning, appreciates the special bond between the ship and the WVCH.

West Virginia in fiction
In Tom Clancy's 1994 novel Debt of Honor, West Virginia is one of several submarines sent to deal with a Japanese invasion of the Northern Mariana Islands. She is used as a "slow-attack" submarine, relying on her stealthiness and her torpedo tubes in combating Japanese forces.
In one scenario of the History Channel series Doomsday, West Virginia and her crew are (briefly) the last surviving remnant of Earth after it is destroyed by a rogue planet, momentarily kept preserved in ocean water sucked off the planet.

References

 

Ships built in Groton, Connecticut
Ohio-class submarines
Cold War submarines of the United States
Nuclear submarines of the United States Navy
1989 ships
Submarines of the United States